Travis Dekker (born October 21, 1985) is a former American football tight end. He was signed by the Green Bay Packers as an undrafted free agent in 2009. He played college football at Air Force. He did not play in the NFL, however, as he served his military commitment with the Air Force; the Packers released him off the reserve/retired list in 2015. After his military service, Dekker attended Georgetown University's medical school and is currently an orthopedic surgery resident at Duke University Hospital.

References

External links
Green Bay Packers bio

Further reading

American football tight ends
Air Force Falcons football players
Green Bay Packers players
1985 births
Living people
Place of birth missing (living people)